Randhir Singh (born 18 October 1946) is an Indian sports administrator and a former Olympic-level trap and skeet shooter. Singh is one of India's most influential sports administrators and is noted for his wide-ranging international connections. He has held several positions in both Indian and international sports administration, and also had a successful shooting career before retiring from the sport. 

Singh is the Acting President of the Olympic Council of Asia (OCA), beginning his term on 11 September 2021. His other roles in international sports administration include being a member of the International Olympic Committee (IOC) from 2001 to 2014 and since 2014, he has been an honorary member of the IOC. He has also served as the Secretary General of the OCA from 1991 to 2015. In domestic sports administration, his roles have included being the Secretary General of the Indian Olympic Association (IOA) from 1987 to 2012 and a member of the governing board of the Sports Authority of India from 1987-2010. Singh was also crucial in bringing the 2010 Commonwealth Games to Delhi.  

Singh's achievements during his shooting career include competing in five Olympic Games and becoming the first Indian shooter to win a gold medal in the Asian Games, which he did at the 1978 Asian Games. He received the Arjuna Award in 1979 for his achievements in shooting. Singh began his sports administration career in 1984 and was still an active shooter at the time, before retiring from shooting in 1994.

Background and early life

Randhir Singh was born on 18 October 1946 in Patiala, Punjab Province, British India. He is the son of Raja Bhalindra Singh, a younger son of Maharaja Bhupinder Singh of Patiala.

Singh comes from a family of influential sports administrators. His uncle, Maharaja Yadavindra Singh, played an important part in lobbying for and then organizing the first Asian Games in 1951 in Delhi, India. His father, Bhalindra, was a member of the International Olympic Committee (IOC) from 1947 to 1992, President of the Indian Olympic Association (IOA) from 1960 to 1975 and 1990–1984, and was crucial in bringing the 1982 Asian Games to Delhi. Singh was educated at Yadvindra Public School, in Patiala and graduated from St. Stephen's College, Delhi with a Bachelor of Arts in History.

Shooting career
Singh made his competitive senior shooting debut as an eighteen-year-old, when he was part of the winning trap shooting team at the Indian National Championships in 1964. The team successfully defended the title in 1965, and Singh won his first national individual title in 1967 in skeet shooting. He went on to win multiple titles at the national level in both skeet and trap shooting. He became the first Indian shooter to win a gold medal in the Asian Games, which he did during the 1978 Asian Games in Bangkok, Thailand. Singh received the Arjuna Award in 1979. During the 1982 Asian Games in Delhi, Singh was part of the Indian team that won a silver medal.

From 1968 to 1984, Singh competed at five Olympic Games in mixed trap. He was the second Indian, after Karni Singh, to compete at five Olympics. His best Olympic performance was 17th at the 1968 Olympics, two points behind Karni Singh and four points from bronze. He has also competed at four Asian Games, winning a medal of each color. His last international competition was the 1994 Asian Games in Hiroshima, Japan. Singh, who had been the Secretary General of the Olympic Council of Asia (OCA) since 1991, became the first person to compete in the Asian Games while being an office bearer in a continental sports organisation.

Sports administration 

Singh is known to be one of India's most influential sports administrators and was an influential member of the IOC during his time as a full member of the organisation. Singh began his sports administration career in 1984, when he was elected to the IOA as a joint secretary. He was elected to the IOC during the 112th IOC session in 2001, which was held in Moscow, Russia. In the election, he received 101 votes, which was the highest amongst all the candidates. Singh served as a member of the IOC from 2001 to 2014, and has been an honorary member of the IOC since 2014.

Singh has also served as the Secretary General of the IOA from 1987 to 2012, a member of the governing board of the Sports Authority of India from 1987-2010, the Secretary General of OCA from 1991 to 2015, the Life Vice President of the OCA from 2015 to 2021 and is serving as the Acting President of the OCA since 2021. He has also been a member of the World Anti-Doping Agency Foundation Board from 2003 to 2005, and is a member of the Association of National Olympic Committees Executive Board since 2002.

Singh has served on the following commissions: Olympic Games Study from 2002 to 2003, Sport for All since 2004, Women and Sport since 2006, Coordination for the 1st Summer Youth Olympic Games in Singapore in 2010 and the Olympic Truce Foundation since 2007. He was the Founder Secretary General of the Afro-Asian Games Council from 1998 to 2007, and helped lead the organization of the only Afro-Asian Games in Hyderabad in 2003.

2010 Commonwealth Games 

Singh was instrumental in bringing the 2010 Commonwealth Games to Delhi, and had been the Vice Chairman of the Organizing Committee. He has been the only senior office bearer of the controversial Organizing Committee who has a clean image. During the planning of the 2010 Commonwealth Games, Singh and Suresh Kalmadi, President of the IOA at the time, clashed over the planning of the games. Reportedly, the clashes had reach the extent where Manmohan Singh, who was the Prime Minister of India at the time, had to be informed by the head of the Commonwealth Games, Mike Fennell.

Olympic Council of Asia 
Singh has served as the Secretary General of the OCA from 1991 to 2015. In 2019, the General Assembly of the OCA appointed Singh as the chairman of coordination committee of 2022 Asian Games, which are being held in Hangzhou, China.

Acting presidency (2021-present) 
In September 2021, Singh was appointed as the Acting President of the OCA, and the OCA's headquarters is in Kuwait City. He was appointed as the Acting President of the OCA after Sheikh Ahmed Al-Fahad Al-Ahmed Al-Sabah stepped aside as president following a guilty verdict against him by a Geneva Court in a forgery case. In May 2022, after the OCA Executive Board meeting in Tashkent, Uzbekistan, he stated that the 2022 Asian Games have been postponed to 2023 due to China's COVID-19 related complications. 

In October 2022, Singh in the OCA General Assembly meeting in Phnom Penh, Cambodia, said that the state of the OCA has now normalised post the COVID-19 pandemic. At the 2022 OCA General Assembly, Singh was one of the signatories that signed the contract to host the 2029 Asian Winter Games, which will be held in Trojena, in NEOM, Saudi Arabia. Also in October 2022, Singh spoke at the OCA's first-ever Gender Equity Seminar in Manama, Bahrain.

Singh, as the Acting President of the OCA, attended the 11th Olympic Summit in December 2022, which was held in Lausanne, Switzerland. During the summit, there was an intense debate regarding the participation of Russian and Belarusian athletes in international competitions. The IOC mentioned that it had not invited athletes from the National Olympic Committees (NOCs) of both countries as protective measures, due to concerns about interference from some governments that can decide which athletes participate in international competitions and concerns about guaranteeing the safety of athletes from the two countries, because of the Russo-Ukrainian war. During the debate, Singh argued that the reasons for the protective measures do not exist in any longer in Asia. He further argued that the OCA has offered to facilitate the particaption of athletes from both countries in competitions within Asia that are under the OCA's authority, and at the same time, comply with the sanctions that are in place on Russia and Belarus due to the war. The Olympic Summit unanimously agreed to further look into the OCA's proposal.

In January 2023, the IOC agreed to the OCA's proposal and allowed athletes from Russia and Belarus to compete in competitions organised by the OCA to potentially qualify for the 2024 Summer Olympics, which will be held in Paris. The IOC also added that the athletes from both countries will compete as neutral athletes and will not represent their countries. Singh stated that the athletes from both countries will not interfere with Asian athletes for medals from OCA organised competitions or for qualification places for the Olympics. Singh also stated that the athletes from both countries will be awarded serperate medals from the Asian athletes and that the IOC will be implementing a separate quota system for Olympic qualifications for Russian and Belarusian athletes. However, the IOC's decision was criticised by Ukrainian President Volodymyr Zelenskyy. Zelenskyy also sent a letter to the leaders of various global governing bodies asking them to stop the participation of athletes from Russia and Belarus.

Awards 

 Arjuna Award - 1979
 Maharaja Ranjit Singh Award - 1979
 Merit Award from OCA - 2005
 Merit Award from ANOC -2006
 Olympic Order, Silver - 2014
 Honorary Doctorate of literature from Lakshmibai National Institute of Physical Education, Government of India

Personal life
Singh has been married twice. His first marriage was to Uma Kumari. His second marriage is to Vinita Singh, who is a businesswoman. Vinita is the eldest child and only daughter of business magnate, Vipin Khanna. Singh has 3 daughters; Mahima, Sunaina and Rajeshwari. Sunaina Kumari has also served as one of the vice-presidents of the Indian Olympic Association. Rajeshwari Kumari is a sports shooter and fashion designer. Rajeshwari is Singh's daughter through his second marriage with Vinita.

See also
 List of athletes with the most appearances at Olympic Games

References

External links
 
Sports-Reference Profile

1946 births
Living people
Indian Sikhs
People from Patiala
Sportspeople from Patiala
St. Stephen's College, Delhi alumni
Indian male sport shooters
Trap and double trap shooters
Skeet shooters
Olympic shooters of India
Shooters at the 1968 Summer Olympics
Shooters at the 1972 Summer Olympics
Shooters at the 1976 Summer Olympics
Shooters at the 1980 Summer Olympics
Shooters at the 1984 Summer Olympics
Recipients of the Arjuna Award
Asian Games gold medalists for India
Asian Games silver medalists for India
Asian Games bronze medalists for India
Asian Games medalists in shooting
Shooters at the 1978 Asian Games
Shooters at the 1982 Asian Games
Shooters at the 1986 Asian Games
Shooters at the 1994 Asian Games
Medalists at the 1978 Asian Games
Medalists at the 1982 Asian Games
Commonwealth Games competitors for India
Shooters at the 1978 Commonwealth Games
Khanna family
International Olympic Committee members
Sport shooters from Punjab, India
Indian sports executives and administrators
World Anti-Doping Agency members